This is a list of corals of the Solomon Islands. The baseline survey of marine biodiversity in the Solomon Islands that was carried out in 2004, found 474 species of corals in the Solomons as well as nine species which could be new to science. This is the second highest diversity of corals in the World, second only to the Raja Ampat Islands in eastern Indonesia.

The baseline survey (published in 2006) identified the following coral varieties as being present in the Solomons:

References

Coral reefs
Geography of the Solomon Islands
Corals of the Solomon Islands